The 1997 Detroit Lions season was their 68th in the National Football League (NFL).
 
The Lions rebounded from a disastrous 1996 season, finishing 9–7 and qualifying for the playoffs for the fifth time in seven seasons – the best stretch in franchise history.

Bobby Ross replaced Wayne Fontes as head coach. The highlight of the season was Barry Sanders becoming the third player in NFL history to rush for at least 2,000 yards in a season. Sanders shared the 1997 Associated Press MVP Award with Packers quarterback Brett Favre.

As a team, the Lions set an NFL rushing record, gaining 5.51 yards per rushing attempt. The Lions scored 379 points in 1997, the fourth-most of any team in the league.

Offseason

NFL Draft

Personnel

Staff

Roster

Regular season 
The final game of the regular season, on December 21, was marked by emotional highs and lows. Entering the game at 8–7 and needing a win to secure a playoff berth, the Lions played host to the 9–6 New York Jets, who like the Lions would be eliminated from the playoffs with a loss (although the Jets still had a chance to win the AFC East and get a home playoff game). In addition, Barry Sanders entered the game with a chance to potentially break the NFL’s single season rushing record – Sanders entered the game with 1,869 rushing yards, leaving him 131 from 2,000 and 237 away from what would have been a record setting 2,106 yards, topping Eric Dickerson’s 2,105 set in 1984. The Lions won the game 13–10, clinching the playoff spot and eliminating the Jets from the playoffs. A fourth-quarter touchdown run by Sanders proved decisive, and he finished with 184 yards to top out at 2,053 for the year – with Sanders rushing for an even 2,000 yards over the final 14 games. Sanders became only the third man to rush for 2,000 yards in a season after O. J. Simpson and Dickerson and had rushed for the second most yards in a season (since then Terrell Davis, Jamal Lewis, Chris Johnson, and Adrian Peterson have accomplished the feat; through the 2021 season, Sanders’ total is the fourth highest total behind Dickerson's 2,105, Peterson’s 2,096 in 2012, and Lewis’ 2,066 in 2003).

The mood, however, was somewhat tempered due to a career-ending injury suffered by Lions’ linebacker Reggie Brown. Brown was assisting on a tackle made on Jets running back Adrian Murrell when his head was struck by another player's leg. Brown suffered a spinal cord injury on the play and lost consciousness. At one point Brown actually stopped breathing and nearly died on the field, but was resuscitated. Brown did not move for seventeen minutes, and was eventually carried by ambulance out of the Silverdome. Brown was diagnosed with a spinal cord contusion and never played in the NFL again, although surgery did enable him to continue to be mobile. Brown's injury evoked memories of former Lion Mike Utley's paralyzing injury in 1991 and former Jet Dennis Byrd’s broken neck in 1992. Brown was also not the only Lion to suffer a career ending neck injury in 1997, as defensive back Harry Colon suffered damage to his neck during an earlier game against the New York Giants.

Schedule

Game summaries

Week 17

Standings

Playoffs

NFC Wild Card Game: at Tampa Bay Buccaneers 

Tampa Bay won their first playoff game since 1979 with quarterback Trent Dilfer's 9-yard touchdown pass to receiver Horace Copeland, running back Mike Alstott's 31-yard touchdown run, and two field goals. Their defense limited Lions quarterback Scott Mitchell to just 10 of 25 completions for 78 yards.

Awards and honors 
 Barry Sanders, NFL MVP
 Barry Sanders, NFL Offensive Player of the Year

References

External links 
 Detroit Lions on Pro Football Reference
 Detroit Lions on jt-sw.com

Detroit
Detroit Lions seasons
Detroit Lions